Aditya Academy (Secondary) is a CBSE co-educational English medium school with boarding facilities. It was founded in 2003 by Bhaskar Aditya and is situated in Kadambagachi, Barasat, West Bengal. It is owned by Bhaskar Aditya Group. It is one of the top CBSE schools in Kolkata, and second largest self-owned school chain in West Bengal.

Events 

During a special event in 2018, Diego Maradona and Sourav Ganguly visited to play a football match 'Diego Vs Dada'. It was played in the ASOS stadium. 

Bengali celebrities like Prosenjit Chatterjee, Biswanath Basu, Ankush Hazra among others, also visited this place during different events organised by the school.

References

Boarding schools in West Bengal
High schools and secondary schools in West Bengal
Schools in North 24 Parganas district
Schools affiliated to CBSE
2003 establishments in West Bengal
Educational institutions established in 2003

External links